Jhargram Sadar Subdivision is an administrative Subdivision (till now only Subdivision) of the Jhargram district in the state of West Bengal, India. It became part of the Jhargram district from 4 April 2017 after splitting from the Paschim Medinipur district.

History
Jhargram subdivision was created in 1922 with the police stations at Jhargram, Gopiballavpur and Binpur.

Geography

Jhargram subdivision covers an area of 3,037.64 km2 and had a population of 1,136,548 in the 2011 census. 96.52% of the total population was rural and only 3.48% was urban population. 20.11% of the total population belonged to scheduled castes and 29.37% belonged to scheduled tribes.

Jhargram subdivision has  10 police stations, 8 community development blocks, 8 panchayat samitis, 79 gram panchayats, 2,996 mouzas, 2513 inhabited villages, 1 municipality and 1 census town. The single municipality is at Jhargram. The census town is Silda:  The subdivision has its headquarters at Jhargram.

Gram panchayats
The subdivision contains 79 gram panchayats under 8 community development blocks:

 Binpur I block: Andharia, Binpur, Lalgarh, Sijua, Baita, Dahijuri, Nepura, Belatikri, Dharampur and Ramgarh.
 Binpur II block: Banspahari, Bhulaveda, Kanko, Shimulpal, Belpahari, Ergoda, Sandapara, Bhelaidiha, Harda and Silda.
 Jamboni block: Chinchra, Dubra, Kapgari, Parihati, Chilkigarh, Gidhni, Kendadangri, Dharsa, Jamboni and Lalbandh.
 Jhargram block: Aguiboni, Dudhkundi, Patashimul, Shalboni, Bandhgora, Lodhasuli, Radhanagar, Chandri, Manikpara, Sapdhara, Chubka, Nedabahara and Sardiha.
 Gopiballavpur I block: Alampur, Gopiballavpur, Saria, Shashrha, Amarda, Kendugari and Satma.
 Gopiballavpur II block: Beliaberah, Kharbandhi, Nota, Tapshia, Chorchita, Kuliana and Pet Bindhi.
 Nayagram block: Ara, Baranegui, Chandrarekha, Malam, Baligeria, Berajal, Jamirapal, Nayagram, Barakhakri, Chandabilla, Kharikamathani and Patina.
 Sankrail block: Andhari, Khudmorai, Pathra, Sankrail, Chhatri, Kultikri, Ragrah,  Dhanghori, Laudaha and Rohini.

Police stations
Police stations in Jhargram subdivision have the following features and jurisdiction:

Blocks
Community development blocks in Jhargram subdivision are:

Education
Jhargram subdivision had a literacy rate of 70.92% in 2011.

Given in the table below (data in numbers) is a comprehensive picture of the block-wise-wise education scenario in Jhargram subdivision for the year 2013-14:

 Note: Primary schools include junior basic schools; middle schools, high schools and higher sNecondary schools include madrasahs; technical schools include junior technical schools, junior government polytechnics, industrial technical institutes, industrial training centres, nursing training institutes etc.; technical and professional colleges include engineering colleges, medical colleges, para-medical institutes, management colleges, teachers training and nursing training colleges, law colleges, art colleges, music colleges etc. Special and non-formal education centres include sishu siksha kendras, madhyamik siksha kendras, adult high schools, centres of Rabindra mukta vidyalaya, recognised Sanskrit tols, institutions for the blind and other handicapped persons, Anganwadi centres, reformatory schools etc.
 
The following institutions are located in Jhargram subdivision:

 Jhargram Raj College at Jhargram was established in 1949.
 Vivekananda Satavarshiki Mahavidyalaya was established in 1964 at Manikpara.
 Lalgarh Government College was established in 2014 at Lalgarh.
 Silda Chandra Sekhar College was established in 1971 at Silda.
 Seva Bharati Mahavidyalaya at Kapgari was established in 1964.
 Nayagram Pandit Raghunath Murmu Government College was established in 2014 at Baligeria.
 Sankrail Anil Biswas Smriti Mahavidyalaya was established at Kultikri in 2007.
 Subarnarekha Mahavidyalaya was established at Gopiballavpur in 1988.

Healthcare
In 2017, Jhargram subdivision has been declared as a health district to improve the healthcare system. The table below (all data in numbers) presents a subdivision-wise overview of the medical facilities available and patients treated in the hospitals, health centres and sub-centres in 2014 in Paschim Medinipur district.  
 

Excluding Nursing Homes

Medical facilities
Medical facilities in the Jhargram subdivision are as follows:

Hospitals: (Name, location, beds) 
Jhargram Subdivisional Hospital, Jhargram (M), 265 beds

Rural Hospitals: (Name, CD block, location, beds) 
Binpur Rural Hospital, Binpur I CD block, Binpur, 30 beds
Belpahari Rural Hospital, Binpur II CD block, Belpahari, 30 beds
Kharikamathani Rural Hospital, Nayagram CD block, Kharikamathani, 30 beds
Bhangagarh Rural Hospital, Sankrail CD block, Bhanga Gar, PO Keshiapata, 30 beds
Gopiballavpur Rural Hospital, Gopiballavpur I CD block, Gopiballavpur, 30 beds
Tapsia Rural Hospital, Gopiballavpur II CD block, Topsia, 30 beds

Block Primary Health Centres: (Name, CD block, location, beds)
Mohanpur Block Primary Health Centre, Jhargram CD block, Montipa-Mohanpur, 10 beds
Chilkigarh Block Primary Health Centre, Jambani CD block, Chilkigarh, 15 beds

Primary Health Centres : (CD block-wise)(CD block, PHC location, beds)
Jhargram CD block: Lauriadam (PO Rajabas) (10), Manikpara (10), Chubka (PO Khalseuli) (6), Chandri (6)
Binpur I CD block: Laghata (PO Nachipore) (4)
Binpur II CD block: Ergoda (PO Ashakanthi) (6), Odulchuan (10), Silda (6)
Jambani CD block: Chinchira (10), Kapgari (6)
Nayagram CD block:Chandabila (10), Jamirapal (6), Baligeria (6)
Sankrail CD block: Pathra (6), Kultikri (10)
Gopiballavpur I CD block: Sasra (10), Alampur (6), Dhansole (4)
Gopiballavpur II CD block: Tentulia (PO Jahanpur) (10), Ramchandrapur (PO Kharbandhi) (6), Nota (PO Dhandangri) (6)

Electoral constituencies
Lok Sabha (parliamentary) and Vidhan Sabha (state assembly) constituencies in Jhargram district were as follows from 2006:

References

Subdivisions of West Bengal
Subdivisions in Jhargram district
Jhargram district